Tim Kirby (born June 23, 1988) is an American former ice hockey defenseman who played for the Air Force Falcons men's ice hockey team which competes in NCAA's Division I in the Atlantic Hockey conference. Currently, since 2019, he coaches the Air Force ACHA DIII Hockey Team who qualified for nationals in his first year (2019-2020).

Awards and honors

References

External links

1988 births
American men's ice hockey defensemen
Living people
Air Force Falcons men's ice hockey players
Ice hockey players from Minnesota
AHCA Division I men's ice hockey All-Americans